The 1999-00 Austrian Hockey League season was the 70th season of the Austrian Hockey League, the top level of ice hockey in Austria. Four teams participated in the league, and EC KAC won the championship.

Regular season

Playoffs

External links
Austrian Ice Hockey Association

Aus
1999–2000 in Austrian ice hockey leagues
Austrian Hockey League seasons